Geiselhöring is a town in the Straubing-Bogen district, in Bavaria, Germany. It is situated 14 km southwest of Straubing, and 30 km southeast of Regensburg.

Personalities 
The following personalities come from Geiselhöring and / or have / had to deal with Geiselhöring:
 Hans-Jürgen Buchner (born 1944) named his music group Haindling after the district of the same name
 Elli Erl (born 1979), winner of Germany is looking for the superstar 2003
 Luise Kinseher (born 1969), cabaret artist and actress, grew up in Geiselhöring
 Heinrich Weber (1940-2010), tenor

References

External links
Official site

Straubing-Bogen